WOCA (1370 AM) is a commercial radio station in Ocala, Florida, broadcasting to the Ocala area. WOCA broadcasts a variety of syndicated and conservative-leaning programs, including The Glenn Beck Program  and The Clark Howard Show each weekday, and Fox Sports Radio on weekends. The station also produces shows for a number of local commentators. WOCA signed on on November 19, 1957, as WHYS. In 1959, the call letters were changed to WKOS. In 1965, the station adopted a Top 40 format as WWKE. The station then switched to the current calls, WOCA in 1983.

External links
 WOCA official website

 Ocala Star Banner: November 18, 1957.  WHYS ad is on p.6.  Retrieved June 3, 2011.
 Ocala Star Banner: November 19, 1957, p.1.  Article: "Ocala's Third Radio Station Goes On Air."

OCA
Talk radio stations in the United States
Radio stations established in 1957
1957 establishments in Florida
News and talk radio stations in the United States